Burna is an unincorporated community and census-designated place (CDP) in central Livingston County, Kentucky, United States. As of the 2010 census the population was 257. It is home to the North Livingston Elementary School and Livingston County Middle School.

The name was decided upon by a contest. A young girl named Burna was selected as the winner, and so the town was named after her.

Geography
Burna is in central Livingston County along U.S. Route 60, which leads east  to Salem and southwest  to Smithland, the county seat.

Demographics

Culture
Burna is the center of Happy Trails Ministry begun in 2004 by Chris Clarke, a Southern Baptist missionary who carries the gospel message to the equestrian community throughout Kentucky and neighboring states.

References

Unincorporated communities in Livingston County, Kentucky
Census-designated places in Livingston County, Kentucky
Unincorporated communities in Kentucky
Census-designated places in Kentucky